Ice Cream is a 1986 Indian Malayalam film, directed by Antony Eastman and produced by Hameed. The film stars Mammootty, Lissy, Jayarekha and Innocent in the lead roles. Musical score of the film is composed by Johnson.

Cast

Mammootty as Thampi
Lissy as Rekha
Jayarekha
Innocent as Police Officer
Thilakan as Omanakuttan Nair
KPAC Lalitha as Elizabeth
Ashokan as Prakashan
Sankaradi as Doctor
Bharath Gopi as Panikkar
Karamana Janardanan Nair
Mala Aravindan as Worker
Philomina as Mother
T. P. Madhavan as Bhaskaran

Soundtrack
The music was composed by Johnson and the lyrics were written by Poovachal Khader.

References

External links
 

1986 films
1980s Malayalam-language films
Films scored by Johnson